2826 km is a rural locality (a railway station) in Uvanovskoye Rural Settlement of Kalachinsky District, Russia. The population was 3 as of 2010.

Geography 
The village is located 34 km east-north-east from Kalachinsk.

Streets 
 Zheleznodorozhnaya

References 

Rural localities in Omsk Oblast